Roderick Edwin Kanehl (April 1, 1934 – December 14, 2004) was an American second baseman and outfielder in Major League Baseball who played his entire career with the New York Mets (1962–1964). Beloved by Mets fans, his attitude was exemplary for a team that lost a modern-era record 120 games in its inaugural season. Kanehl hit the first grand slam in Mets history on July 6, 1962, at the Polo Grounds.

Before making the major leagues, Kanehl played for eight seasons in the New York Yankees' and Cincinnati Reds' minor league systems. In 1962, at age 28, he was given an opportunity to try out for the Mets' opening season. Through spring training, he worked tirelessly for a spot on the roster. He leaped over an outfield wall in pursuit of a ball and he scored from second on a wild pitch. His attitude and all-out play earned him the nickname ′′Hot Rod′′.

Despite the objections and criticisms of the Mets' general manager George Weiss, manager Casey Stengel stuck with Kanehl. Stengel liked Kanehl's hustle and determination to play the game.

In a three-year career spanning 340 games, Kanehl batted .241 and accrued six home runs, 47 RBI, 103 runs, 23 doubles and 17 stolen bases. A highly versatile utilityman, he played every position except pitcher and catcher.

Kanehl played his final major-league season when Shea Stadium opened its doors in 1964. After the 1964 season, the Mets did not invite Kanehl to spring training, but also prevented him from taking a minor league coaching job he had been offered by the Yankee organization. He worked in construction, sold insurance, and later owned a restaurant. When Stengel died in 1975, Kanehl was the only former Mets player who was present at the funeral.

After suffering a heart attack, Kanehl died at a hospital in Palm Springs, California at age 70.

Quote
 Baseball is a lot like life. The line drives are caught, the squibbles go for base hits. It's an unfair game.

Notes

External links

1934 births
2004 deaths
Amarillo Gold Sox players
Baseball players from Wichita, Kansas
Dallas Rangers players
Houston Buffs players
McAlester Rockets players
Major League Baseball infielders
Monroe Sports players
Nashville Vols players
New York Mets players
Peoria Chiefs players
Richmond Virginians (minor league) players
Winston-Salem Twins players